Big Brother 2003, also known as Big Brother 3, was the third season of the Australian reality television series Big Brother. The season lasted 86 days, starting on 27 April 2003 and ending on 21 July 2003. The season was the most complicated to date with housemates starting in two separate houses - a "round house" and a "square house". Housemate Benjamin Archbold was sent in first and spent the entire first day by himself. Other housemates were progressively admitted. On Night 22, all Housemates were locked into their respective bedrooms and a construction crew spent the night merging the two houses and revealing the hidden swimming pool and kitchen that had been in between the two smaller houses. Housemates were released into their new combined house on the morning of Day 23. Later in the day, a bathroom linking the two bedrooms was revealed.

In the Square house (which was on the right of the compound) were Belinda, Jaime, Irena, Carlo and Claire with Vincent and Saxon joining later in the week. After Ben entered the Round house on Day 1, Joanne, Regina, Chrissie, Daniel, Patrick and Leah were progressively admitted over the first week. The cameras were completely hidden for the first time in this season. Previously some cameras were visible to housemates and at times housemates were aware of the camera tracking their movements. On Day 68, Anouska Golebiewski who was the first to be evicted from Big Brother UK 4 series showing at the time, was brought in for a little over a week. The winner of season 3 was Regina Bird. Regina earned public admiration with her down-to-earth charm and work ethic.

New programs
Two new shows were introduced: 
UpLate hosted by Mike Goldman. Mike Goldman was best known for doing the voiceovers in the daily show. UpLate was broadcast late at night showing live vision from the house with minimal editing.
The Insider hosted by Tim Ferguson was a panel-type show with additional gossip and discussion about the show. Frequently the week's evicted housemate would be one of the show's guests.

Opening sequence
The Tower of Terror is displayed, and the logos of Dreamworld, Big Brother Australia, Network Ten and a map of Australia turns into a housemate-selection machine. We go through the orange bedroom, through the blue bathroom for a shower, through to the blue control room, to the edit section where footage from the diary room is being edited to be shown on the Big Brother Australia yellow stage. We then go to the purple kitchen, and three housemates are up for nomination the red housemate gets the most votes. The pink dining room is broadcast to a person on the internet at home. After 85 days, a winner is selected.

Incidents
An incident of Big Brother 2003 involved housemate Belinda Thorpe in what was later dubbed "Belindagate". After a night of drinking, an intoxicated Belinda confided in housemate Carlo that her younger sibling had been involved in the murder of a homosexual man. The information was not immediately revealed by Belinda as she whispered it to Carlo and house microphones did not pick it up, however after she left the room Carlo passed the information on to the other housemates.

The incident sparked a legal crisis for Endemol Southern Star and Network Ten as the identification of a minor involved in a court trial is illegal in Queensland, where Big Brother is produced. Within seconds of the information being revealed the live Internet feeds were cut and left blank for several hours. Users watching the feeds began discussing the incident on the official website discussion boards. Moderators began deleting these messages but could not keep up with the large amount being posted and eventually the messages boards were closed down. They were re-opened for a short period before being closed again permanently. As a result, there were no official message boards during the following 2004 series.

The information spread out to unofficial Big Brother websites and several days later the show producers acknowledged the incident. An edited version of the nights events was shown on Big Brother Uncut, except in Queensland where it was cut entirely. 
Brett Jensen, the 15th original housemate (a policeman) left lockdown before Big Brother 3 began. Tamara, a travel agent and the 16th housemate, appeared on the Launch show but did not enter the house as she was a decoy for the public. Both were from Queensland.

Housemates

Future appearances
Regina Bird returned to compete again on Big Brother 14, and won, making Regina the first player of Big Brother Australia to win twice.

Nominations Table
The first housemate in each box was nominated for two points, and the second housemate was nominated for one point.
  Housemates living in the round house
  Housemates living in the square house

Notes

 : Housemates could only nominate others from their respective house. This week, Housemates nominated to evict and to stay. Unknown to the Housemates, the nominations to evict had no value, and the Housemates nominated for eviction were the ones with the fewest points to stay.
 : Housemates could only nominate others from their respective house. 
 : On Day 17, both houses were tasked with choosing a male and female Housemate who were not nominated to be intruders to the other house. Big Brother informed them that all four intruders would face eviction, but the survivors of the eviction would have immunity the following week. Ben and Regina were sent from the Round House to the Square House, while Claire and Jamie went from Square House to the Round House. On Day 19, the Housemates voted in the Intruder Eviction; the Housemates ranked the intruders in the order they wish to evict, resulting in Jamie's eviction.
: The Houses merged on Day 22. As a result of surviving the Intruder Eviction, Ben, Claire, and Regina were immune from eviction this week.

Special shows

Live Surprise

The New Housemates

Round House Surprise

The Final Housemates

The Party's Over

Meet The Neighbours

Intruder Eviction

Intruder Alert

Guess Who's Coming To Dinner

The Final Countdown

The Final Sunday Eviction

References

External links
Behind Big Brother Archive - Season 3; Updates, Daily Shows and Diary Room Visits

2003 Australian television seasons
03